Ovcharovo may refer to:

 In Bulgaria (written in Cyrillic as Овчарово):
 Ovcharovo, Dobrich Province - a village in Dobritchka municipality, Dobrich Province
 Ovcharovo, Haskovo Province - a village in Harmanli municipality, Haskovo Province
 Ovcharovo, Shumen Province - a village in Shumen municipality, Shumen Province
 Ovcharovo, Targovishte Province - a village in Targovishte municipality, Targovishte Province